Printing and writing papers are paper grades used for newspapers, magazines, catalogs, books, notebooks, commercial printing, business forms, stationeries, copying and digital printing. About 1/3 of the total pulp and paper marked (in 2000) is printing and writing papers. The pulp or fibers used in printing and writing papers are extracted from wood using a chemical or mechanical process.

Paper standards
The ISO 216:2007 is the current international standard for paper sizes, including writing papers and some types of printing papers. This standard describes the paper sizes under what the ISO calls the A, B, and C series formats.

Not all countries follow ISO 216. North America, for instance, uses certain terms to describe paper sizes, such as Letter, Legal, Junior Legal, and Ledger or Tabloid.

Most types of printing papers also do not follow ISO standards but have features that conform with leading industry standards. These include, among others, ink adhesion, light sensitivity, waterproofing, compatibility with thermal or PSA overlaminate, and glossy or matte finish.

Additionally, the American National Standards Institute or ANSI also defined a series of paper sizes, with size A being the smallest and E the largest. These paper sizes have aspect ratios 1:1.2941 and 1:1.5455.

Vietnam

Types
 Fine paper
 Machine finished coated paper
 Newsprint

History
The history of paper is often attributed to the Han dynasty (25-220 AD) when Cai Lun, a Chinese court official and inventor, made paper sheets using the “bark of trees, remnants of hemp, rags of cloth, and fishing nets.” Cai Lun's method of papermaking received praise during his time for offering a more convenient alternative to writing on silk or bamboo tablets, which were the traditional materials in ancient Chinese writing.

On the other hand, archeological evidence supports that the ancient Chinese military had used paper over a hundred years before Cai Lun's contribution and that maps from early 2nd century BCE were also made with paper. With this, it appears that what Cai Lun accomplished is not an invention but an improvement in the papermaking process. Today, even with the presence of modern tools and machines for papermaking, most processes still involve the traditional steps that Cai Lun employed, namely the process of soaking felted fiber sheets in water, draining the water, and then drying the fiber into thin sheets.

In 1690, the very first paper mill in America was established by William Rittenhouse. The mill became the largest manufacturer of paper in America for over a hundred years until other paper mills sprang up, including the paper mill by William Bradford which supplied paper to the New York Gazette.

References

External links

 Writing Paper
 Paper Writing

 
Paper
Materials